Shenandoah High School may refer to:

Shenandoah High School (Indiana), near Middletown, Indiana, United States
Shenandoah High School (Iowa), in Shenandoah, Iowa, United States
Shenandoah High School (Ohio), near Sarahsville, Ohio, United States
Shenandoah High School in Shenandoah Historic District, Shenandoah, Page County, Virginia, United States